Route 2 (Chinese: 二號幹綫) of Hong Kong is a series of expressways that runs from Quarry Bay of Hong Kong Island to Ma Liu Shui of the New Territories East, formerly known as route 6, and renamed as route 2 in 2004 under the route numbering scheme proposed in the same year.
Route 2 consists of 4 parts, from South to North:

 The Eastern Harbour Crossing starting from Quarry Bay, where it joins into the Island Eastern Corridor (Route 4), across Victoria Harbour and ending at Lam Tin, then junction to Tseung Kwan O - Lam Tin Tunnel.
 The Kwun Tong Bypass succeeds the EHC at Lei Yue Mun Interchange and goes along the coast of Kowloon Bay, junctions Route 5 and Route 7 and continues to Diamond Hill.
 Tate's Cairn Tunnel continues the route from Diamond Hill, cutting through Tate's Cairn to Shek Mun Interchange, junctioning the Sha Lek Highway.
 Tate's Cairn Highway, takes the route 2 to its terminus at Ma Liu Shui, where it joins into Tolo Highway of Route 9.

Like Route 3, Route 8, Route 9 and Route 10, most of the route consists of expressways.

Exits and Interchanges

See also

 Kwun Tong Bypass
 Tate's Cairn Highway
 West Kowloon Corridor

References

 Route map from Transport Department
 Highways in Kowloon

Notes

 
Routes in Hong Kong